The following is a list of people who have attained Air rank within the Namibian Air Force (NAF).

Key

The Air Force were previously used Army ranks and insignia but this was changed circa 2010 in line with international norms.

List

References

Namibian military personnel
Military of Namibia
Namibian Air Force air marshals